Meade Stadium is a 6,555-seat multi-purpose stadium in Kingston, Rhode Island. It is home to the University of Rhode Island's Rams football team. The facility opened in 1928 and was originally named Meade Field, in honor of John E. "Jack" Meade, an alumnus and local politician, said to have attended every home football and basketball game until his death in 1972. The facility adopted its current name in 1978, when an aluminum and steel grandstand was added.

The stadium has undergone many changes in its history.  The old field house was built in 1933, and in 1934, the west stands and press box were opened, with a capacity of 1,500.  In 1978, the 50-row steel grandstand was erected on the east side, bringing the total capacity up to 8,000.  Various other projects, including a press box expansion and modernization of the turf and scoreboard, took place soon after.  In 2000, the west stands and field house were razed to make way for the Ryan Center.  During the 2006 football season, a new set of west stands opened abutting the Ryan Center, whose east luxury boxes also look down on Meade Stadium. In the spring and summer of 2019, the university undertook a $4.1 million project that brought lights and field turf to Meade Stadium.

Attendance

See also
 List of NCAA Division I FCS football stadiums

References

External links
Meade Stadium on GoRhody.com
Interactive Map Of FCS College Football Stadiums: Click on the Rhode Island Logo to get a satellite view & directions to the stadium

College football venues
Rhode Island Rams football
Multi-purpose stadiums in the United States
American football venues in Rhode Island
Sports venues in Washington County, Rhode Island
1928 establishments in Rhode Island
Sports venues completed in 1928